Al Tazaj is a BBQ chicken Arabic fast casual restaurant chain headquartered in Jeddah, Saudi Arabia. The chain has presence in many countries of the Middle East.

Meals and service
The chain serves limited meals including rice and kofta (elongated meatballs), kofta sandwiches, whole chickens with rice, fries, nuggets, kebabs, burgers, chicken wings, and a few local meals depending on the country. Their speciality is wood charcoal-grilled chicken which is butterflied and marinated in garlic and lime sauce. Half or whole chicken is served with freshly baked pita bread, rice or corn on the cob.
Chicken versions of Saudi meals are also served in Saudi Arabia, including Chicken Mandi and Chicken Kabsa.

Locations
There are numerous locations, mainly in Saudi Arabia and the United Arab Emirates. Restaurants are also located in Bahrain, Jordan, Kuwait, Lebanon, Morocco, Oman, Qatar, Iraq and Yemen.

The first restaurant in the Americas, named TAZA, opened in Chicago, Illinois in the United States from 1996. In addition, TAZA USA launched U.S. Operations as a franchisor in Orlando, FL in 2001.

See also

 List of fast-food chicken restaurants

References

External links

Interview in Asharq Alawsat about product placement by Al Tazaj
Article about the opening of the American locations
Press release  reports that Al Tazaj is one of the top 40 Arab brands according to Forbes Arabia
http://articles.orlandosentinel.com/2001-12-31/business/0112290467_1_saudi-arabia-nunez-outlet

Restaurants established in 1989
Fast-food franchises
Barbecue restaurants
Companies based in Jeddah
Fast-food chains of Saudi Arabia
Fast-food poultry restaurants
Saudi Arabian brands
Saudi Arabian companies established in 1989